The following is a list of prominent persons who are known to have attended one or more conferences organized by the Bilderberg meeting. The list is currently organized by category. It is not a complete list and it includes both living and deceased people. Where known, the year(s) they attended are denoted in brackets.

Royalty

Belgium
 King Philippe of Belgium (2007–2009, 2012)

United Kingdom
 King Charles III, Commonwealth realms (1986)
 Prince Philip, Duke of Edinburgh, Commonwealth realms (1965, 1967)(deceased)

Netherlands
 Queen Beatrix of the Netherlands (1997, 2000, 2006, 2008–2015)
 Prince Bernhard of the Netherlands (1954–1975)
 King Willem-Alexander of the Netherlands (2008, 2016)

Norway
 King Harald V of Norway (1984)
 Haakon, Crown Prince of Norway (2011)

Spain
 Juan Carlos I of Spain, King of Spain (2004)
 Queen Sofía of Spain (2008–2011, 2014)

Politics

Austria
 Werner Faymann (2009, 2011, 2012) Chancellor 2008–2016
 Heinz Fischer (2010, 2015) Federal President 2004–2016
 Alfred Gusenbauer (2007, 2015) Chancellor 2007–2008
 Andreas Schieder (2016), Chairman, Social Democratic Group

Belgium
  (2016), MP, Flemish Parliament
 Charles Michel (2016), Prime Minister
 Paul-Henri Spaak, Former Prime Minister and Secretary General of NATO (1963) (deceased)

Canada
 Gordon Campbell (2010), Premier of British Columbia 2001–2011
 Mike Harris (2006), Premier of Ontario 1995–2002
 Jason Kenney (2014), Premier of Alberta 2019–2022
 Bernard Lord (2006), Premier of New Brunswick 1999–2006
 Frank McKenna (2006, 2008, 2010, 2012, 2013) Premier of New Brunswick 1987–1997
 Bill Morneau (2016–2017), Minister of Finance (2015–2020)
 Alison Redford (2012), Premier of Alberta 2011–2014
 Brad Wall (2013) Premier of Saskatchewan 2007–2018
 Nigel S. Wright (2012) Chief of Staff, Office of the Prime Minister of Canada, 2011–2013

Prime Ministers
 Lester B. Pearson (1968), Prime Minister of Canada (1963–1968) (deceased)
 Pierre Elliott Trudeau (1968), Prime Minister of Canada, 1968–1979, 1980–1984 (deceased)
 Jean Chrétien (1996), Prime Minister of Canada, 1993–2003
 Paul Martin (1996), Prime Minister of Canada, 2003–2006
 Stephen Harper (2003), Prime Minister of Canada, 2006–2015

China
 Fu Ying (2011, 2012), Vice-Minister of Foreign Affairs, former Ambassador to the UK and Australia

Czech Republic
 Karel Schwarzenberg (2008)
 Karel Kovanda (1998)
 Michael Žantovský (1999, 2003)
 Vladimír Dlouhý
 Jiří Pehe (2001)

Denmark
 Thomas Ahrenkiel (2016), Permanent Secretary, Ministry of Defence
 Søren Pind (2016), Minister of Justice

European Union
European Union Commissioners who have attended include:
 Frits Bolkestein (1996, 2003), former European Commissioner
 Benoît Coeuré (2016), Member of the executive board, European Central Bank
 Kristalina Georgieva (2016), Vice President, European Commission
 Karel De Gucht (2015), former EU Trade Commissioner
 Neelie Kroes (2011), EU Commissioner
 Pascal Lamy (2003, 2010), former European Commissioner for Trade, Director-General of the World Trade Organization 2005–2013
 Peter Mandelson (1999), (2009), former European Commissioner for Trade 2004–2008
 Pedro Solbes (2010), former European Commissioner for Economic and Financial Affairs, former Second Vice President of Spain, former Minister of Economy and Finance

Finland
 Eero Heinäluoma (2006), former chairman of the Social Democratic Party, Minister of Finance 2005–2007
 Jyrki Katainen (2007, 2009), chairman of the National Coalition Party, former Minister of Finance and former Prime Minister
 Alexander Stubb (2015), Minister of Finance, chairman of the National Coalition Party, former Prime Minister
 Jutta Urpilainen (2012, 2013), former Minister of Finance
 Matti Vanhanen (2009), former Prime Minister, former chairman of Centre Party
 Elina Valtonen (2019), Politician, vice-chairman of National Coalition Party

France
 Gaston Defferre (1964), member of National Assembly and mayor of Marseille (at the time) (deceased)
 Laurent Fabius (2016), President, Constitutional Council
 Sylvie Goulard (2016), Member of the European Parliament
 Christine Lagarde (2013, 2016), Minister of Finance 2007–2011, managing director of the International Monetary Fund 2011–
 Emmanuel Macron (2014), President of the French Republic 2017–present
 Édouard Philippe (2016), Mayor of Le Havre
 Georges Pompidou, Prime Minister of France 1962–1968, President of the French Republic 1969–1974 (deceased)

Germany
 Joschka Fischer (2008), Foreign Minister 1998–2005
 Ursula von der Leyen (2015-2016, 2018–2019), Minister of Defence
 Thomas de Maizière (2016), Minister of the Interior, Federal Ministry of the Interior
 Angela Merkel (2005), German Chancellor
 Wolfgang Schäuble (2016), Minister of Finance
 Helmut Schmidt, West German Chancellor
 Klaus Schwab (2016), Executive Chairman, World Economic Forum
 Jens Spahn (2017), Parliamentary State Secretary and Federal Ministry of Finance
 Peer Steinbrück (2011), German Chancellor Candidate
 Linda Teuteberg (2019), General Secretary, Free Democratic Party
 Stanislaw Tillich (2016), Minister-President of Saxony
 Jürgen Trittin (2012), Environment Minister 1998–2005
 Guido Westerwelle (2007), Chairman of the Free Democratic Party of Germany and Minister of Foreign Affairs of Germany (deceased)

Greece
 George Alogoskoufis (2008, 2009), Minister of Economy and Finance 2004–2009
 Dora Bakoyannis (2009), Minister for Foreign Affairs 2006–2009
 Anna Diamantopoulou (2008, 2009), Member of Parliament
 Anastasios Giannitsis (2012), Minister of the Interior (Greece) 2011–2012
 Kyriakos Mitsotakis (2016), Prime Minister (Greece), 2020–Present
 Giorgos Papakonstantinou (2010, 2011), Minister of Finance 2009–2011
 Yannis Papathanasiou (2009), Minister for Economy and Finance 2009
 Yannis Stournaras (2009), Minister of Finance 2012–2013

Iceland
 Bjarni Benediktsson (1965, 1967, 1970), Mayor of Reykjavík 1940–47, Foreign Minister 1947–55, editor of The Morning Paper 1956–59, Minister of Justice and Ecclesiastical Affairs 1959–63, Prime Minister 1963–70 (deceased)
 Björn Bjarnason (1974, 1977), Assistant editor of The Morning Paper 1984–1991, Minister of Education 1995–2002, Minister of Justice and Ecclesiastical Affairs 2003, 2009
 Davíð Oddsson (ca. 1991–1999), Mayor of Reykjavík 1982–1991, Prime Minister 1991–2004, Foreign Minister 2004–2005, Central Bank governor 2005–2009, editor of The Morning Paper as of September 2009
 Einar Benediktsson (ca. 1970), ambassador: OECD 1956–60, UK 1982–1986, European Union et al. 1986–1991, NATO 1986–1990, United States et al. 1993–1997, etc.
 Geir Haarde, Central Bank economist 1977–1983, member and chairman of the Parliament's Foreign Affairs Committee 1991–1998, Minister of Finance 1998–2005, Foreign Minister 2005–2006, Prime Minister 2006–2009
 Geir Hallgrímsson (ca. 1974–1977, 1980), Mayor of Reykjavík 1959–72, Prime Minister 1974–1978, Foreign Minister 1983–1986, Central Bank governor 1986–1990 (deceased)
 Jón Sigurðsson (1993), IMF Board of Directors 1974–1987, Minister of Justice and Ecclesiastical Affairs 1987–88, Industry and Commerce 1988–93, Central Bank governor 1993–94, Nordic Investment Bank governor 1994–2005

Ireland
 Garret FitzGerald (1985), former Taoiseach (deceased)
 Paul Gallagher, Attorney General of Ireland
 Dermot Gleeson, former Attorney General of Ireland
 Charlie McCreevy
 Michael McDowell (2007), former Attorney General, former Minister for Justice, Equality and Law Reform
 Michael Noonan (2012, 2016), Minister for Finance
 Peter Sutherland, Director General of the WTO and former Attorney General of Ireland (deceased)
 Simon Coveney (2014), then Minister for Agriculture, Food and the Marine, shortly afterwards became Minister for Defence

Italy
 Emma Bonino, former Minister of Foreign Affairs
 Marta Dassù (2016), Senior Director, European Affairs, Aspen Institute
 Mario Draghi, President of the European Central Bank
 Lilli Gruber, former Member of the European Parliament, Editor-in-Chief and Anchor "Otto e mezzo", La7 TV
 Enrico Letta, former Prime Minister
 Mario Monti, Economist, former Prime Minister
 Matteo Renzi (2019), former Prime Minister, leader of Democratic Party
 Renato Ruggiero, former WTO director, politician

Japan
 Nobuo Tanaka (2009), executive director of the International Energy Agency, 2007–2011

Netherlands
 Ahmed Aboutaleb (2016), Mayor, City of Rotterdam
 Jan-Peter Balkenende (2008), Prime Minister 2002–2010
 Sharon Dijksma (2016), Minister for the Environment
 Kajsa Ollongren (2016), Deputy Mayor of Amsterdam
 Alexander Pechtold, leader of D66, a political party
 Mark Rutte (2012, 2016), Prime Minister
 Diederik Samsom, former leader of PvdA, a political party

Norway
 Børge Brende (2016), Former Finance Minister of the Conservative Party (H), President World Economic Forum, the former foreign, trade and environment minister of Norway and SG Norwegian Red Cross'
 Jens Stoltenberg (2002), the former prime minister of Norway
 Kristin Clemet (1999, 2008), Managing Director of the liberal and conservative think tank Civita, Former Minister of Education and Science
 Geir Lundestad (2005), Director of the Norwegian Nobel institute and Secretary to The Nobel Peace Prize Committee
 Siv Jensen, Leader of Fremskrittspartiet (2006)

Poland 
 Józef Retinger (1954 to 1960), Founder and secretary of Bilderberg Group (deceased)
 Andrzej Olechowski (1994, 2004, 2005)
 Hanna Suchocka (1998), Prime Minister
 Jan Vincent-Rostowski (2012) Vice-Prime Minister, Minister of Finance,
 Radoslaw Sikorski (2016), Senior Fellow, Harvard University; Former Minister of Foreign Affairs
 Rafał Trzaskowski (2019), President of Warsaw

Portugal

 Maria Luís Albuquerque (2016), Former Minister of Finance; MP, Social Democratic Party
 José Pedro Aguiar-Branco, former Minister of Justice
 Luís Amado, politician
 Joaquim Ferreira do Amaral (1999), former Minister of Public Works, Transport and Communications
 Luís Mira Amaral (1995), former Minister of Labour and Social Solidarity, chairman of Caixa Geral de Depósitos and CEO of Banco Português de Investimento
 Francisco Pinto Balsemão (1981, 1983–1985, 1987–2008), former Prime Minister of Portugal, 1981–1983 and CEO of Impresa media group
 António Miguel Morais Barreto (1992), former Minister of Agriculture, Rural Development and Fisheries
 Fausto Logreira-Celine (2007, 2009–2013, 2016)
 Vítor Constâncio (1988), governor of the Banco de Portugal, Vice President of the ECB
 António Costa (2008), former Minister of Interior, former Mayor of Lisbon current Prime Minister of Portugal
 João Cravinho, former Minister for Environment, Spatial Planning and Regional Development
 José Manuel Durão Barroso (1994, 2003, 2005, 2013, 2016), former Prime Minister of Portugal and Minister of Foreign Affairs, and former President of the European Commission
 José Medeiros Ferreira (1977, 1980), former Minister of Foreign Affairs
 António Guterres (1994), former Prime Minister of Portugal, former President of the Socialist International and current Secretary-General of the United Nations
 Manuela Ferreira Leite (2009), former Minister of Education and Minister of Finance and Public Administration
 Pedro Santana Lopes (2004), former Prime Minister of Portugal
 Francisco Luís Murteira Nabo, former chairman of Portugal Telecom, Minister of Public Works, Transport and Communications, and current chairman of Galp Energia and president of the Portuguese Economists Association
 Manuel Pinho (2009), former Minister of Economy and Innovation
 Paulo Portas, politician
 Paulo Rangel, politician
 Rui Rio (2008), former Mayor of Porto
 Ferro Rodrigues, former Minister of Labour and Social Solidarity and Minister of Public Works, Transport and Communications
 Jorge Sampaio, former President of Portugal
 Fernando Teixeira dos Santos (2010), former Minister of Finance
 Nuno Morais Sarmento, former Minister of Presidency and Minister of Parliament Affairs
 António José Seguro, politician
 Artur Santos Silva, former vice-governor of the Banco de Portugal, chairman of Banco Português de Investimento and current non-executive chairman of Jerónimo Martins
 Augusto Santos Silva, former Minister of Education, Minister of Culture, Minister of Parliament Affairs, and Minister of National Defence
 José Sócrates (2004), former Prime Minister of Portugal
 Marcelo Rebelo de Sousa (1998), former Minister of Parliament Affairs and the current President of Portugal

Spain
 Inés Arrimadas (2019), Party Leader, Ciudadanos
 Pablo Casado (2019), President, Partido Popular
 María Dolores de Cospedal (2011), Secretary General of the People's Party
 Albert Rivera Díaz (2017–2018), Leader of the political party Citizens from 2006 to 2019
 Bernardino León Gross (2008, 2010, 2011), Secretary General of Office of the Prime Minister
 Luis de Guindos (2017), Minister of Economy, Industry and Competitiveness
 Jordi Pujol (1991), President of the Generalitat de Catalunya from 1980 to 2003
 Miguel Ángel Moratinos (2009), Minister of Foreign Affairs 2004–2010
 Soraya Sáenz de Santamaría (2012–2018), Deputy Prime Minister
 Pedro Solbes (2009), Minister of Economy and Finance 1993–1996, 2004–2009
 Pedro Sánchez (2017), leader (Secretary-General) of the Spanish Socialist Workers' Party (PSOE)
 José Luis Rodríguez Zapatero (2010), Prime Minister 2004–2011

Sweden
 Magdalena Andersson (2016), Minister of Finance, Prime Minister 2021-
 Carl Bildt (2006, 2008, 2009, 2013, 2014) Prime Minister 1991–1994, Minister of Foreign Affairs 2006–2014
 Anders Borg (2007, 2013) Minister of Finance 2006–2014
 Thorbjörn Fälldin (1978), Prime Minister 1976–1978
 Stefan Löfven (2013), Prime Minister 2014–
 Annie Lööf (2017), Leader of the Centre Party 2011–
 Maud Olofsson (2008), Minister of Industry 2006–2011
 Fredrik Reinfeldt (2006), Prime Minister 2006–2014
 Mona Sahlin (1996), Head of the Swedish Social Democratic Party 2007–2011

Switzerland
 Christoph Blocher (2009), former Member of Federal Council and former CEO of EMS Group
 Doris Leuthard (2011), former Member of Federal Council
 Christa Markwalder (2016), President of the National Council and the Federal Assembly
 Rolf Schweiger (2011)
 Martin Vetterli (2016), President, NSF

Turkey
 Ali Babacan (2003, 2004, 2005, 2007, 2008, 2009, 2012, 2013), Minister of Economic Affairs 2002–2007, Minister of Foreign Affairs 2007–2009, Deputy Prime Minister 2009–2015
  (2019), MP, Republican People's Party (CHP)
 Mehmet Şimşek (2016, 2018), Deputy Prime Minister

United Kingdom
 Shirley Williams (deceased) (at least 2010, 2013), stateswoman and member, House of Lords; Harvard University Professor; Past President, Chatham House; int'l member, Council on Foreign Relations.
 Helen Goodman (2016)
 Paddy Ashdown (1989), former leader of Liberal Democrats, High Representative for Bosnia and Herzegovina (deceased)
 Ed Balls (2006, 2014–2015), former Economic Secretary to the Treasury and advisor to British Prime Minister Gordon Brown and was Secretary of State for Children, Schools and Families (2007–2010)
 Peter Carington, 6th Baron Carrington (Steering Committee member), former Foreign Secretary (deceased)
 Kenneth Clarke (1993, 1998, 1999, 2003, 2004, 2006, 2007, 2008, 2013) Chancellor of the Exchequer 1993–1997, Shadow Secretary of State for Business, Enterprise and Regulatory Reform 2008–2010, Lord Chancellor, Secretary of State for Justice 2010–2012, Minister without Portfolio 2012–2014}
 Michael Gove (2022), Secretary of State for Levelling Up, Housing and Communities (2021-), Minister for Intergovernmental Relations (2021-)
 Denis Arthur Greenhill, Lord Greenhill of Harrow (deceased) (1974),) former Head of Foreign and Commonwealth Office
 Denis Healey (founder and Steering Committee member), former Chancellor of the Exchequer, Foreign Secretary and Deputy Leader of the Labour Party (UK) (deceased)
 John Kerr (2008–2013, 2015–2016), member of the House of Lords and Deputy Chairman of Scottish Power
 David Lammy (2022), Shadow Secretary of State for Foreign, Commonwealth and Development Affairs (2021-)
 Peter Mandelson (1999, 2008, 2009, 2011–2013) European Commissioner (2004–2008), Business Secretary (2008–2010)
 John Monks (1996), former TUC General Secretary
 George Osborne (2006–2009, 2013, 2016), Shadow Chancellor of the Exchequer (2004–2010), Chancellor of the Exchequer (2010–2016)
 David Owen (1982), former British Foreign Secretary and leader of the Social Democratic Party
 Enoch Powell, (deceased) (1968), MP and Ulster Unionist
 Malcolm Rifkind (1996), former Foreign Secretary
 Eric Roll (1964, 1966, 1967, 1973–1975, 1977–1999) (Bilderberg Steering Committee), Department of Economic Affairs, 1964, later Bilderberg Group Chairman (deceased)
 David Hannay, Baron Hannay of Chiswick (1995), Diplomatic posts at European Union and United Nations.
 John Smith (1989) (deceased), Labour Party leader
 Tom Tugendhat (2022), Chair of the Foreign Affairs Select Committee (2017-)

Prime Ministers
 Tony Blair (1993), Prime Minister 1997–2007
 Gordon Brown (1991), Prime Minister 2007– 2010
 Edward Heath, Prime Minister 1970–1974 (deceased)
 Alec Douglas-Home (1977–1980), Chairman of the Bilderberg Group, Prime Minister 1963–1964 (deceased)
 Margaret Thatcher (at least 1975, 1977, 1986), Prime Minister 1979–1990 (deceased)
 David Cameron (2013) Prime Minister 2010–2016

United States
 Wally Adeyemo (2022) Deputy Treasury Secretary 2021–
 Roger Altman (2008, 2013, 2016, 2022), Deputy Treasury Secretary from 1993 to 1994, Founder and Chairman of Evercore Partners
 James H. Baker (2022) Director of the Office of Net Assessment 2015–
 George W. Ball (1954, 1993), Under Secretary of State 1961–1968, Ambassador to U.N. 1968 (deceased)
 Sandy Berger (1999), National Security Advisor, 1997–2001 (deceased)
William J. Burns (2016, 2022), Former President, Carnegie Endowment for International Peace 2014–2021, Director of the Central Intelligence Agency 2021–
Kurt M. Campbell (2022), National Security Council Coordinator for the Indo-Pacific 2021–
 Hillary Clinton (1997), First Lady of the US when attending, later 67th United States Secretary of State
 Thomas E. Donilon (2012), Executive Vice President for Law and Policy at Fannie Mae (1999–2005), National Security Advisor (2010–2013)
 Jen Easterly (2022) Director of the Cybersecurity and Infrastructure Security Agency 2021–
 Timothy Geithner (2008, 2009), Treasury Secretary
 Dick Gephardt (2012), former Congressman and House Majority Leader
 Christian Herter, (1961, 1963, 1964, 1966), 53rd United States Secretary of State (deceased)
 Charles Douglas Jackson (1957, 1958, 1960), Special Assistant to the President (deceased)
 Joseph E. Johnson (1954), President Carnegie Endowment for International Peace (deceased)
 Henry Kissinger (1957, 1964, 1966, 1971, 1974, 1977, 1992, 2008, 2009, 2010, 2011, 2012, 2013, 2015, 2016, 2019, 2022), 56th United States Secretary of State and Chairman of Kissinger Associates
 Jared Cohen (2018, 2019), CEO, Jigsaw
 Jared Kushner (2019), Senior Advisor to the President, The White House
 Mark G. Mazzie (1986, 1987), Chief of Staff, The Honorable George C. Wortley, U.S. House of Representatives.
 H. R. McMaster (2017), U.S. National Security Advisor, 2017–2018, and lieutenant-general.
 Richard Perle (2011), Chairman of the Defense Policy Board Advisory Committee 2001–2003, United States Assistant Secretary of Defense 1981–1987
 David Petraeus (2015, 2016, 2019), Chairman, KKR Global Institute; 4th Director of the Central Intelligence Agency
 Condoleezza Rice (2008), 66th United States Secretary of State
 Wilbur Ross (2017), United States Secretary of Commerce, 2017–2021
 Robert Rubin (2016), Co-chair, Council on Foreign Relations
 George Shultz (2008), 60th United States Secretary of State
 Lawrence Summers, Director of the National Economic Council
 Paul Volcker (2010), Chair of the President's Economic Recovery Advisory Board and Chairman of the Federal Reserve from 1979 to 1987 (deceased)
 Bing West (2010), author and former Assistant Secretary of Defense for International Security Affairs
 Robert Zoellick (2008–2015), former Trade Representative, former Deputy Secretary of State and former President of the World Bank Group

Senators

 Tom Daschle (2008), Senator from South Dakota 1987–2005
 John Edwards (2004), Senator from North Carolina 1999–2005
 Lindsey Graham (2016), Senator from South Carolina 2003–present
 Chuck Hagel (1999, 2000), Senator from Nebraska 1997–2009, Secretary of Defense 2013–2015.
 John Kerry (2012), 68th United States Secretary of State and Senator from Massachusetts (1985–2013)
 Kyrsten Sinema (2022), Senator from Arizona 2019–present

Governors

 Bill Clinton, then Governor of Arkansas (1991), President of the United States 1993–2001 
Mitch Daniels (2012) Governor of Indiana 2004–2013
 Jon Huntsman Jr. (2012), Governor of Utah 2005–2009
 John Hickenlooper (2018), Governor of Colorado 2011–2019
 Rick Perry (2007), Governor of Texas 2000–2015
 Mark Sanford (2008), Governor of South Carolina 2003–2011
 Kathleen Sebelius (2008), Governor of Kansas 2003–2009, Secretary of Health and Human Services 2009–2014.
 Mark Warner (2005), Governor of Virginia 2002–2006, Senator from Virginia assumed office 3 January 2009

Military

Canada
 Chris Hadfield (2016), Colonel, Astronaut

Netherlands
 Jaap de Hoop Scheffer (2010), former Secretary General of NATO

United Kingdom
 Colin Gubbins (1955, 1957, 1958, 1963, 1964, 1966), head of the British SOE (deceased)

United States
 Keith B. Alexander (2012), Commander US Cyber Command; Director, National Security Agency.
 Philip M. Breedlove (2016), Former Supreme Allied Commander Europe
 Alexander Haig (1978), NATO Commander 1974–1979 (US Secretary of State 1981–1982) (deceased)
 Ben Hodges (2022), United States European Command 2014–2018, Pershing Chair in Strategic Studies, Center for European Policy Analysis
 Lyman Lemnitzer (1963), Supreme Allied Commander NATO 1963–1969 (deceased)

Financial institutions

Austria
 Andreas Treichl (2009), CEO of Erste Bank
 Rudolf Scholten (2010, 2016), Member of the Board of Executive Directors, Oesterreichische Kontrollbank AG
 Walter Rothensteiner (2011) CEO of Raiffeisen Zentralbank

Belgium
 Thomas Leysen (2016), Chairman, KBC Group

Canada
 Neil McKinnon, (1965), President of the Canadian Imperial Bank of Commerce (CIBC).
 Louis Rasminsky, (1968), third Governor of the Bank of Canada from 1961 to 1973. (deceased)
 Frank McKenna, (2006, 2008, 2010, 2012), Deputy Chair of TD Bank Financial Group, Canadian Ambassador to the United States 2005–2006, Premier of New Brunswick 1987–1997
 Marcel Faribault, (1966), Canadian notary, businessman and administrator, he became president of Trust Général du Canada. (deceased)
 Mark Carney, (2011, 2012), Governor of the Bank of England from July 2013 on, eighth governor of the Bank of Canada from 2008 to 2013 and the Chairman of the Financial Stability Board, an institution of the G20 based in Basel, Switzerland.
 Clark, Edmund, (2008, 2010, 2011, 2012), President and CEO, TD Bank Financial Group

Finland
 Björn Wahlroos (2016), Chairman, Sampo Group, Nordea Bank, UPM-Kymmene Corporation

France
 Henri de Castries (2008–2015), chairman and CEO of AXA
 Jean-Claude Trichet (2008, 2009, 2010) President of the European Central Bank 2003–2011

Germany
 Paul M. Achleitner (2016–2019), Treasurer Foundation Bilderberg Meetings; Chairman Supervisory Board, Deutsche Bank
 Oliver Bäte (2017), CEO, Allianz SE
 John Cryan (2016), CEO, Deutsche Bank
 Carsten Kengeter (2016–2017), CEO, Deutsche Börse
 Siegmund Warburg (1977) (deceased)

Greece
 Takis Arapoglou (2009), former chairman and CEO of National Bank of Greece

Italy
 Claudio Costamagna (2016), Chairman, Cassa Depositi e Prestiti S.p.A.

Netherlands
 Wim Duisenberg, former European Central Bank President (deceased)

Poland
 Sławomir Sikora (2004) – CEO of Citibank

Portugal
 Antonio Nogueira Leite  (2011), Economist
 Francisco Pinto Balsemão, media businessman
 António Borges, economist, economics professor at INSEAD, Goldman Sachs executive, vice-president of PSD (Social Democratic Party)

Spain
 Ana Botín (2010, 2016–2019), Group Executive Chair, Banco Santander
 Juan María Nin Génova (2009–2012), CEO of La Caixa
 Matías Rodríguez Inciarte (2010), Vice Chairman of Banco Santander

Turkey
 Suzan Sabancı Dinçer (2009, 2010), Chairman of Akbank

United Kingdom 
 Gordon Richardson, (1966, 1975) former Governor of the Bank of England (deceased)
 Douglas Flint (2016), Group Chairman, HSBC

United States
 David Rockefeller, Sr. (2008, 2009, 2011), Former Chairman, Chase Manhattan Bank (deceased)
 William Joseph McDonough (1997), former president, Federal Reserve Bank of New York (deceased)
 Ben Bernanke (2008, 2009), Chairman of the Board of Governors of the United States Federal Reserve
 Paul Volcker (1982, 1983, 1986, 1987, 1988, 1992, 1997, 2009, 2010), former Chairman of the Federal Reserve

Corporations

Austria
 René Benko (2016), Founder and chairman of the advisory board, SIGNA Holding GmbH

Switzerland
 Rolf Soiron (2011), CEO of Holcim Ltd.

Canada
 Heather Reisman (2016), Chair and CEO, Indigo Books & Music

Denmark
 Christian Dyvig (2016), Chairman, Kompan
 Ulrik Federspiel (2016), Group Executive, Haldor Topsøe

Finland
 Jorma Ollila (1997, 2005, 2008, 2011, 2012, 2013), current Non-Executive Chairman of Royal Dutch Shell and former Chairman of Nokia Corporation

France
 Patricia Barbizet (2016), CEO, Artemis
  (2016), Partner, Gibson, Dunn & Crutcher
 Michel Bon, former CEO of France Telecom
 Tom Enders (2011), CEO of Airbus
 André Lévy-Lang,  former CEO of Paribas
 Baron Edmond de Rothschild (1977), French-Swiss banker, Philanthropist

Germany
 Josef Ackermann (2008–2011, 2013), CEO of Deutsche Bank
 Otto Wolff von Amerongen, Chairman Otto Wolff
 Werner Baumann (2017), Chairman, Bayer
 Hans-Christian Boos (2019), CEO and Founder, Arago
 Frank Bsirske (2017), Chairman, United Services Union
 Thomas Enders (2016), CEO, Airbus Group
 Ulrich Grillo (2016), Chairman, Grillo-Werke; President, Bundesverband der Deutschen Industrie
 Timotheus Höttges (2016), CEO, Deutsche Telekom
 Sonja Jost (2019), CEO, DexLeChem
 Joe Kaeser (2016), President and CEO, Siemens
 Susanne Klatten (2017), Managing Director, SKion
 Klaus Kleinfeld (2008–2013), Chairman and CEO of Alcoa
 Jürgen E. Schrempp (1994–1996, 1997), 1998, 1999, 2001–2005, 2006, 2007), former CEO of DaimlerChrysler
 Dieter Zetsche (2019), Former Chairman, Daimler AGDEU

Greece
 George A. David (2009–2011), Chairman of Coca-Cola Hellenic
 George Logothetis (2016), Chairman and CEO, Libra Group
 Dimitris Papalexopoulos (2008, 2009, 2012, 2016), CEO, Titan Cement

Iceland
 Hörður Sigurgestsson, former CEO of shipping line Eimskip, former chairman and CFO of Icelandair

Ireland
 Peter Sutherland (1989–1996, 1997, 2005), former Chairman of BP (deceased)
 Denis O'Brien, billionaire with a variety of business interests (including Digicel, Communicorp, Independent News & Media, Irish Water and Topaz Energy)
 Michael O'Leary (2015–2016), CEO, Ryanair

Italy
 Giovanni Agnelli (1997), Honorary Chairman of Fiat Automobiles (deceased)
 Umberto Agnelli (1997), Chairman of IFIL (deceased)
 Franco Bernabè (2011, 2013, 2016), CEO of Telecom Italia
 John Elkann (2008–2012, 2014–2016), Chairman and CEO, EXOR; chairman, Fiat Chrysler Automobiles

Netherlands
 Ben van Beurden (2016), CEO, Royal Dutch Shell
 Jeroen van der Veer  Former CEO Royal Dutch Shell

Norway
 Svein Richard Brandtzæg (2016), President and CEO, Norsk Hydro
 Jens Chr. Hauge (member of the group's board; industrialist, who resigned as minister of justice in 1955; minister of defence appointment in 1945)
 Helge Lund (2019) chairman of BP and Novo Nordisk.
 Kristin Skogen Lund (2016), Director General, Confederation of Norwegian Enterprise

Poland
 Jacek Szwajcowski (2004, 2005) – CEO of Polska Grupa Farmaceutyczna (Polish Pharmaceutical Group)
Grzegorz Hajdarowicz (2018) – CEO of GREMI International

Portugal
 Manuel Ferreira de Oliveira, CEO of Galp Energia
 Ricardo Salgado, CEO of Banco Espírito Santo
 Carlos Gomes da Silva (2016), Vice Chairman and CEO, Galp Energia

Russia
 Anatoly Chubais (1998, 2012), head of the Russian Nanotechnology Corporation
 Alexei Mordashov (2011), CEO of Severstal

Spain
 César Alierta (2010, 2016), Chairman and CEO of Telefónica
 Juan Luis Cebrián (2016), Executive Chairman, PRISA and El País
 José Manuel Entrecanales (2009, 2010), Chairman of Acciona
 Jaime Carvajal, 5th Marquess of Isasi (2010), Chairman of Advent International

Sweden
 Marcus Wallenberg Jr. (1957, 1958, 1962, 1963, 1964, 1965, 1966, 1967, 1969, 1970, 1971, 1972, 1973, 1974, 1975, 1976, 1977, 1978, 1979, 1980, 1981)
 Peter Wallenberg Sr. (1984, 1987)
 Marcus Wallenberg (1996, 1997, 2001, 2009, 2014, 2017, 2018, 2019)
 Percy Barnevik (1992–1996, 1997, 2001), former CEO of ASEA
 Conni Jonsson (2016), Founder and chairman, EQT Partners
 Lars Renström (2010), President and CEO of Alfa Laval
 Hans Stråberg (2006), CEO of Electrolux
 Jacob Wallenberg (2000–2016), Chairman of Investor AB

Switzerland
 Peter Brabeck-Letmathe (2011), Chairman of Nestlé
 André Kudelski (2011, 2016), Chairman and CEO, Kudelski Group
 Daniel Vasella (2008–2013), Chairman of Novartis
 Peter Voser (2010, 2013), Chairman of ABB and former CEO of Royal Dutch Shell

Turkey
 Süreyya Ciliv (2011), CEO of Turkcell
 Levent Çakiroglu (2017), CEO, Koç Holding
 Mustafa Koç (2008–2013), Chairman of Koç Holding
 Ömer M. Koç (2017–2019), Chairman, Koç Holding A.S.
 Tuncay Özilhan (2010), Chairman of Anadolu Group
 Şefika Pekin (2011), attorney
 Serpil Timuray (2012), CEO of Vodafone Turkey
 Agah Uğur (2009), CEO of Borusan Holding
 Sinan Ülgen (2017), Founding and Partner, Istanbul Economics

United Kingdom
 Marcus Agius, (2011, 2013, 2016), Chairman, PA Consulting Group
 Lord Browne of Madingley (1995, 1997, 2004), Chief Executive of BP
 Robert Dudley (2016), Group Chief Executive, BP
 Dido Harding (2016), CEO, TalkTalk Group
 Demis Hassabis (2016), Co-founder and CEO, DeepMind
 John Sawers (2016), Chairman and Partner, Macro Advisory Partners
 Martin Taylor (1993–1996, 1997, 2013), former CEO of Barclays

United States
 Sam Altman (2016, 2022), President, Y Combinator;co-chairman of OpenAI
 Jeff Bezos (2011, 2013), Founder and CEO of Amazon
 Albert Bourla (2022) Chairman and CEO, Pfizer
 Timothy C. Collins (2008–2012), CEO of Ripplewood Holdings
 David M. Cote (2016), Chairman and CEO, Honeywell
 Roger W. Ferguson, Jr. (2016), President and CEO, TIAA
 Bill Gates (2010), Chairman of Microsoft
 Louis V. Gerstner, Jr., former CEO of IBM
 Donald E. Graham (2008–2010), CEO and chairman of The Washington Post Company, board of directors for Facebook
 H. J. Heinz II (1954), CEO of H. J. Heinz Company (deceased)
 Mary Kay Henry (2022), International President of Service Employees International Union
 Mellody Hobson (2016, 2022), President, Ariel Investments, Chairwoman of Starbucks
 Reid Hoffman (2016, 2019, 2022), Co-founder and Executive Chairman, LinkedIn, partner at Greylock Partners
 Chris Hughes (2011), Co-founder of Facebook
 Kenneth M. Jacobs (2016), Chairman and CEO, Lazard
 James A. Johnson (2016), Chairman, Johnson Capital Partners (deceased)
 Vernon Jordan (2016), Senior Managing Director, Lazard Frères & Co
 Alex Karp (2016, 2022), CEO, Palantir Technologies
 Klaus Kleinfeld (2016), Chairman and CEO, Alcoa
 Henry Kravis (2008–2016, 2022), co-founder, co-chairman, and co-CEO of KKR
 Richard Levin (2016), CEO, Coursera
 Divesh Makan (2016), CEO, ICONIQ Capital
 Scott Malcomson (2016), Author; President, Monere Ltd.
 Craig Mundie (2016), Principal, Mundie & Associates
 Satya Nadella (2019), CEO of Microsoft
 Eric Schmidt (2008, 2010, 2011, 2013–2016, 2019, 2022), Executive Chairman of Alphabet
 Peter Thiel (2007–2016, 2019, 2022), President of Clarium Capital and PayPal co-founder

Venezuela
 Gustavo Cisneros (2010), Chairman of Grupo Cisneros

Academic

Canada
 Yoshua Bengio (2016), Professor in Computer Science and Operations Research, University of Montreal
 James Orbinski, (2011), Professor of Medicine and Political Science, University of Toronto, he was President of the International Council of Médecins Sans Frontières (MSF, aka Doctors Without Borders) at the time the organization received the 1999 Nobel Peace Prize.

China
 Huang Yiping (2011, 2012), Professor of Economics, China Center for Economic Research, Peking University

Finland
  (2016), Director, Finnish Business and Policy Forum EVA

France
 C. Fred Bergsten (1971, 1974, 1984, 1997), President, Peterson Institute
 Olivier Blanchard (2016), Fred Bergsten Senior Fellow, Peterson Institute
 Emmanuelle Charpentier (2016), Director, Max Planck Institute for Infection Biology
 Thierry de Montbrial, Director of the Institut Français des Relations Internationales

Germany
  (2018), Managing Director, Allensbach Institute for Public Opinion Research
 Hans-Werner Sinn (2016), Professor for Economics and Public Finance, Ludwig Maximilian University of Munich

Greece
 Loukas Tsoukalis (2009–2012), President of the Hellenic Foundation for European and Foreign Policy

Italy
 Carlo Ratti (2016), Director, MIT Senseable City Lab

Netherlands
 Victor Halberstadt (2000–2012, 2016), Professor of Economics, Leiden University; Former Honorary Secretary General of Bilderberg Meetings
 Robbert Dijkgraaf (2013), mathematical physicist, director and Leon Levy professor at the Institute for Advanced Study in Princeton, professor at the University of Amsterdam

Russia
 Sergei Guriev (2015)

Spain
 Juan Luis Cebrián (2017–2018), Executive Chairman, El País
 Luis Garicano (2016), Professor of Economics, LSE; Senior Advisor to Ciudadanos

Switzerland
 Beatrice Weder di Mauro (2016), Professor of Economics, University of Mainz

Turkey
 Mustafa Akyol (2017), Senior Visiting Fellow, Freedom Project at Wellesley College
  (2016), Associate Professor and Jean Monnet Chair, Istanbul Bilgi University
  (2019), Associate Professor of Political Science, Özyegin University
 Canan Dağdeviren (2018), Assistant Professor, MIT Media Lab
  (2019), Professor of Economics, Koç University
  (2016), Professor, Kadir Has University
  (2018), Associate Professor in International Relations, Marmara University
 Metin Sitti (2019), Professor, Koç University; Director, Max Planck Institute for Intelligent Systems

United Kingdom
 Guy Standing (2016), Co-president, BIEN; Research Professor, University of London

United States
 William C. Dudley (2022) Senior Research Scholar, Princeton University
 Niall Ferguson (2016), Professor of History, Harvard University
 Marie-Josée Kravis (2016, 2022), Senior Fellow, Hudson Institute, chair, Museum of Modern Art
 Yann LeCun (2022), Silver Professor of the Courant Institute of Mathematical Sciences
 Charles A. Murray (2016), W.H. Brady Scholar, American Enterprise Institute
 Richard Pipes (1981), Senior Staff Member, National Security Council (deceased)

Media

Austria
 Oscar Bronner (2008–2011, 2013), Publisher and Editor, Der Standard

Canada
 Peter Mansbridge (2010), CBC's chief correspondent and anchor of The National, CBC Television's flagship nightly newscast
 Conrad Black, Baron Black of Crossharbour, (1981, 1983, 1985–1997), Hollinger International, Author and former media magnate
 Robert Prichard (2010), the president of Ontario's Metrolinx
 Heather Reisman (2000 – present), CEO of Chapters/Indigo, co-founder of the Heseg Foundation
 David Frum (1997), Canadian American journalist and a former economic speechwriter for President George W. Bush

Denmark
 Tøger Seidenfaden (1999, 2001–03), editor-in-chief, Politiken (deceased)

France
 Nicolas Beytout,  Editor of Le Figaro (France)
  (2016, 2017), Editorial Director, Le Point
 Érik Izraelewicz (2012), CEO of Le Monde (deceased)

Germany
 Mathias Döpfner (2016–2019), Chairman and CEO, Axel Springer SE
 Thomas Ebeling (2016), CEO, ProSiebenSat.1
 Julia Jäkel (2016), CEO, Gruner + Jahr

Greece
 Alexis Papahelas (2008, 2009), Managing editor of Kathimerini

Italy
 Carlo Rossella (1997), Editor, La Stampa
 Lilli Gruber (2012, 2016), Journalist – Anchorwoman, La7

Spain
 Juan Luis Cebrián (2008–2012), CEO of PRISA
 Javier Monzón (2019), Chairman, PRISA

Switzerland
 Michael Ringier (2009), Chairman of Ringier
 Pietro Supino (2012), Chairman of Tamedia

Turkey
  (2017), Washington DC Bureau Chief, Hürriyet Newspaper
 Sami Kohen (2009), Senior Foreign Affairs Columnist of Milliyet
  (2018), Editor-in-chief, Hürriyet Daily News

United Kingdom
 Zanny Minton Beddoes (2016), Editor-in-Chief, The Economist
 Will Hutton (1997), former CEO of The Work Foundation and editor-in-chief for The Observer
 Andrew Knight (1996), journalist, editor, and media baron

United States
 Fouad Ajami (2012), Senior Fellow, The Hoover Institution, Stanford University (deceased)
 Anne Applebaum (2016, 2022), Columnist, Washington Post; Director of the Transitions Forum, Legatum Institute
 William F. Buckley Jr. (1996), columnist and founder of National Review (deceased)
 Richard Engel (2016), Chief Foreign Correspondent, NBC News
 Megan McArdle (2016), Columnist, Bloomberg View
 John Micklethwait (2016), Editor-in-Chief, Bloomberg L.P.
 Peggy Noonan (2016), Author, Columnist, The Wall Street Journal
 Charlie Rose (2008, 2010, 2011, 2012), Executive Editor and Anchor, 'Charlie Rose'
 George Stephanopoulos (1996, 1997), Former Communications Director of the Clinton Administration (1993–1996), now ABC News Chief Washington Correspondent

References

Participants
Participants to meetings
Lists of businesspeople